The 2010 PGA EuroPro Tour was the ninth season of the PGA EuroPro Tour, one of four third-tier tours recognised by the European Tour.

Schedule
The following table lists official events during the 2010 season.

Order of Merit
The Order of Merit was based on prize money won during the season, calculated in Pound sterling. The top five players on the tour (not otherwise exempt) earned status to play on the 2011 Challenge Tour.

Notes

References

PGA EuroPro Tour